Theretra acuta is a moth of the  family Sphingidae. It is known from the Philippines and Indonesia.

References

Theretra
Moths described in 2010